Jack Smith is an American businessman who co-founded the first free web-based email service, Hotmail.com in 1996.

He has been the CEO of Proximex since 2007.

Career
Jack Smith worked at FirePower Systems Inc., a subsidiary of Canon Inc., where he designed integrated circuits for use in high performance PowerPC workstations, and invented and marketed the first web server accelerator card that boosted server performance significantly.

Later on at Apple Computer, he worked on several of Apple's early PowerBook computers.

He has been the founder and president of EEE.com, building custom Internet web solutions.

Smith came up with the idea for anonymous web-based email in 1995, and worked with Sabeer Bhatia, his colleague at Apple, to found the company. The company opened on July 4, 1996  with Smith as its Chief Technology Officer.

In December 1997, Bhatia sold Hotmail to Microsoft for a reported $400 million.

Smith went on to co-found Akamba Corporation and work as its CEO.

He had also served as a Director of Engineering of Microsoft, first heading its Hotmail engineering division, and then leading a team developing next generation Internet software infrastructure.

In 2007 he was named CEO of Proximex, a physical security information management software provider.

References

Further reading 
 Bronson, Po, "HotMale: Sabeer Bhatia started his company on $300,000 and sold it two years later for $400 million. So, is he lucky, or great?", Wired, Issue 6.12, December 1998

1960s births
Living people
Businesspeople in information technology
Place of birth missing (living people)
American technology chief executives
American chief technology officers
American technology company founders
Canon (company) people
21st-century American inventors